Freedom in the World is a yearly survey and report by the U.S.-based non-governmental organization Freedom House that measures the degree of civil liberties and political rights in every nation and significant related and disputed territories around the world.

Origin and use
Freedom in the World was launched in 1973 by Raymond Gastil. It produces annual scores representing the levels of political rights and civil liberties in each state and territory, on a scale from 1 (most free) to 7 (least free). Depending on the ratings, the nations are then classified as "Free", "Partly Free", or "Not Free". The report is often used by researchers in order to measure democracy and correlates highly with several other measures of democracy such as the Polity data series.

The Freedom House rankings are widely reported in the media and used as sources by political researchers. Their construction and use has been evaluated by critics and supporters.

Country rankings

The rankings are from the Freedom in the World 2019, 2020, 2021, and 2022 surveys, each report covering the previous year. The average of each pair of ratings on political rights and civil liberties determines the overall status of "Free" (1.0–2.5), "Partly Free" (3.0–5.0), or "Not Free" (5.5–7.0).

An asterisk (*) indicates countries which are "electoral democracies". To qualify as an "electoral democracy", a state must have satisfied the following criteria:

 A competitive, multiparty political system;
 Adult suffrage for all citizens without criminal convictions (some states may further punish and subjugate people with criminal convictions by disenfranchising them from the democratic process);
 Regularly contested elections conducted in conditions of ballot secrecy, reasonable ballot security, and the absence of massive voter fraud that yields results that are unrepresentative of the public will; and
 Significant public access of major political parties to the electorate through the media and through generally open political campaigning.

An electoral democracy must have a score of 7 or more out of 12 in political rights subcategory A (Electoral Progress), an overall aggregate score of 20 in their political rights rating and an overall aggregate score of 30 in their civil liberties rating.

Freedom House's term "electoral democracy" differs from "liberal democracy" in that the latter also implies the presence of a substantial array of civil liberties. In the survey, all Free countries qualify as both electoral and liberal democracies. By contrast, some Partly Free countries qualify as electoral, but not liberal, democracies.

World
* indicates "Civil liberties in country or territory" or "Human rights in country or territory" links.

PR = political rights, CL = civil liberties

Territories and countries with limited recognition

2022 rankings

Free

Partially free

Not free

Trends
According to Freedom House, a quarter of all declines of freedom in the world in 2016 took place in Europe.

Percentage of countries in each category, from the 1973 through 2021 reports:

Sources: Country Status and ratings overview 1973–2016, Number and percentages of electoral democracies 1989–2016, Freedom in the World 2018 report covering 2017.

Notes:
 The years shown in the map and table above are the year the survey was released, the data shown covers the prior calendar year.
 The chart and table above do not include data for related/disputed territories.

Evaluation

There is some debate over the neutrality of Freedom House and the methodology used for the Freedom in the World report, which has been written by Raymond Gastil and his colleagues. The neutrality and biases of human-rights indices have been discussed in several publications by Kenneth A. Bollen. Bollen wrote that "Considered together these criticisms suggest that some nations may have been incorrectly rated on Gastil's measures. However, none of the criticisms  have demonstrated a systematic bias in all the ratings. Most of the evidence consists of anecdotal evidence of relatively few cases. Whether there is a systematic or sporadic slant in Gastil's ratings is an open question" (Bollen, 1986, p. 586). The freedom index of Freedom in the World has a very strong and positive (at least an 80%) correlation with three other democracy-indices studied in Mainwaring (2001, p. 53).

Ideological bias or neutrality
In his 1986 study, Bollen discussed reviews of measurements of human rights, including the index reported in Freedom in the World (Bollen, 1986, p. 585). Criticisms of Freedom in the World during the 1980s were discussed by Gastil (1990), who stated that "generally such criticism is based on opinions about Freedom House rather than detailed examination of survey ratings", a conclusion disputed by Giannone. The definition of Freedom in Gastil (1982) and Freedom House (1990) emphasized liberties rather than the exercise of freedom, according to Adam Przeworski, who gave the following example: In the United States, citizens are free to form political parties and to vote, yet even in presidential elections only half of U.S. "citizens" vote; in the U.S., "the same two parties speak in a commercially sponsored unison", wrote .

More recent charges of ideological bias prompted Freedom House to issue this 2010 statement:
Freedom House does not maintain a culture-bound view of freedom. The methodology of the survey is grounded in basic standards of political rights and civil liberties, derived in large measure from relevant portions of the Universal Declaration of Human Rights. These standards apply to all countries and territories, irrespective of geographical location, ethnic or religious composition, or level of economic development.

Mainwaring et alia (2001, p. 52) wrote that Freedom House's index had "two systematic biases: scores for leftist were tainted by political considerations, and changes in scores are sometimes driven by changes in their criteria rather than changes in real conditions." Nonetheless, when evaluated in Latin American countries yearly, Freedom House's index was very strongly and positively correlated with the index of Adam Przeworski and with the index of the authors themselves: They evaluated Pearson's coefficient of linear correlation between their index and Freedom House's index, which was 0.82; among these indices and the two others studied, the correlations were all between 0.80 and 0.86  (Mainwaring et alia, 2001, p. 53).

As previously quoted, Bollen criticized previous studies of Freedom in the World as anecdotal and inconclusive; they raised issues needing further study by scientific methods rather than anecdotes. Bollen studied the question of ideological bias using multivariate statistics. Using their factor-analytic model for human-rights measurements, Bollen and Paxton estimate that Gastil's method produces a bias of -0.38 standard deviations (s.d.) against Marxist–Leninist countries and a larger bias, +0.5 s.d., favoring Christian countries; similar results held for the methodology of Sussman (Bollen and Paxton, 2000, p. 585). In contrast, another method by a critic of Freedom in the World produced a bias for Leftist countries during the 1980s of at least +0.8 s.d., a bias that is "consistent with the general finding that political scientists are more favorable to leftist politics than is the general population" (Bollen and Paxton, p. 585).

Use and conceptual analysis
Criticisms of the reception and uses of the Freedom in the World report have been noted by Diego Giannone:
 "Conceptual stretching", Giovanni Sartori's critical term for a methodological shortcoming common in social studies. Giannone reports as an example that, according to Landman and Hausermann (2003), "the index by FH has been used as a tool for measuring democracy, good governance, and human rights, thus producing a conceptual stretching which is a major cause of 'losses in connotative precision': in short, an instrument used to measure everything, in the end, is not able to discriminate against anything."
 Issues with aggregation. Giannone quotes Scoble and Wiseberg's conclusion (1981) that "the sum of a civil liberty score of 4 and a political liberty score of 2 is the same as the sum of a civil liberty score of 2 and a political liberty score of 4 even though the substantive interpretation of these different combinations is different."
 "Lack of specificity and rigorousness in construction" and "inadequate level of transparency and replicability of the scales", the first referencing to Scoble et alie (1981) and the latter to Hadenius and Teorell (2005). In support of the latter, he also quotes the conclusion of Munck and Verkuilen (2002) that "the aggregate data offered by Freedom House has to be accepted largely on faith", due to the factors that "no set of coding rules is provided, and the sources of information are not identified with enough precision, and because disaggregated data have not been made available to independent scholars".

Time series

In "Political and ideological aspects in the measurement of democracy: the Freedom House case" (2010) which reviewed changes to the methodology since 1990, Diego Giannone concluded that "because of the changes in methodology over time and the strict interconnection between methodological and political aspects, the FH data do not offer an unbroken and politically neutral time series, such that they should not be used for cross-time analyses even for the development of first hypotheses. The internal consistency of the data series is open to question."

On this topic, the Freedom House website replies that they have "made a number of modest methodological changes to adapt to evolving ideas about political rights and civil liberties. At the same time, the time series data are not revised retroactively, and any changes to the methodology are introduced incrementally in order to ensure the comparability of the ratings from year to year."

See also
 Democracy in the Middle East
 Democracy Index
 Freedom of the Press report
 Freedom in the World by region
 Index of Freedom in the World
 List of indices of freedom
 Polity data series

Notes

References
 
 
 
 
  Individuals can download the complete report (pdf format) for private use.

External links
 Freedom in the World 2022 - online at Freedom House
 Freedom in the World 2021 - online at Freedom House
 Freedom in the World 2020 - online at Freedom House
                 Freedom in the World 2019 - online at Freedom House
                 Freedom in the World 2018 - online at Freedom House
                 Freedom in the World 2017 - online at Freedom House
                 Freedom in the World 2016 - online at Freedom House
                 Freedom in the World 2015 - online at Freedom House
                 Freedom in the World 2014 - online at Freedom House
                 Freedom in the World 2013 - online at Freedom House

Human rights
International rankings

no:Freedom in the World
tr:Freedom House Dünya Özgürlük Raporu
vi:Tự do chính trị